David Wilmer Snuggerud (born June 20, 1966) is an American former professional ice hockey right wing who played in the National Hockey League (NHL) between 1989 and 1993. He was drafted by the Buffalo Sabres in the 1987 NHL Supplemental Draft out of the University of Minnesota. Internationally Snuggerud played for the American national team at the 1988 Winter Olympics and the 1989 World Championships.

Playing career
After playing three seasons for the Golden Gophers and one for the U.S. National Team, Snuggerud joined the Sabres for the 1989–90 season. After two-plus seasons with the Sabres, he was traded to the San Jose Sharks during the 1991–92 season in exchange for Wayne Presley.

Snuggerud finished his NHL career with the Philadelphia Flyers in the 1992–93 season. After one year playing with the IHL's Minnesota Moose, Snuggerud retired.  He was a sixth-grade gold team science teacher at Wayzata East Middle School. In his NHL career, Snuggerud appeared in 265 games.  He scored 30 goals and added 54 assists. He had 2 fights total in his career.

He also played for the American national team at the 1988 Winter Olympics and the 1989 World Championships.

Snuggerud is founder and headmaster at Breakaway Academy in Chaska, Minnesota and the head coach at Chaska High School.

Personal life
Snuggerud's nephew, Luc Snuggerud, was drafted by the Chicago Blackhawks in the 2014 NHL Entry Draft. Snuggerud's son, Jimmy, was drafted 23rd overall by the St. Louis Blues in the 2022 NHL Entry Draft.

Career statistics

Regular season and playoffs

International

Awards and honors

References

External links
 

1966 births
Living people
AHCA Division I men's ice hockey All-Americans
American men's ice hockey right wingers
Buffalo Sabres draft picks
Buffalo Sabres players
Ice hockey players from Minnesota
Ice hockey players at the 1988 Winter Olympics
Minnesota Golden Gophers men's ice hockey players
Minnesota Moose players
National Hockey League supplemental draft picks
Olympic ice hockey players of the United States
People from Minnetonka, Minnesota
Philadelphia Flyers players
San Jose Sharks players
American expatriate ice hockey players in Canada